Vitorchiano is a  (municipality) in the Province of Viterbo in the Italian region of Latium, located about  northwest of Rome and about  northeast of Viterbo.

Vitorchiano borders the following municipalities: Bomarzo, Soriano nel Cimino, Viterbo.

Among the religious architecture in the town are the following:

Sant'Antonio di Padova - a Neoclassic-style church built in 1793, adjacent to a Franciscan order convent
Convent of Sant'Agnese - a former convent and church
Sanctuary of San Michele Arcangelo - a 14th century oratory
San Pietro - a Romanesque-style church with decorated portal
Santissima Trinità - a 14th-century church
Santa Maria Assunta in Cielo - a 13th-century Romanesque-style church
Madonna di San Nicola - a 15th-century church with frescoed walls and ceilings

Demographic evolution

References

External links
 www.comune.vitorchiano.vt.it/

Cities and towns in Lazio